Fadlallah al-Haji is a Syrian rebel leader, close to Turkey and the Muslim Brotherhood. Considered a "scrupulous military man" by other Syrian rebel leaders and a "Turkish protégé", al-Haji has led the Sham Legion since its formation in 2014. He was appointed chief of staff of the Syrian Interim Government's General Staff of its Ministry of Defence in 2017, and has been the commander-in-chief of the National Front for Liberation since its formation in 2018. The NFL merged with the Syrian National Army in October 2019, and al-Haji was appointed a deputy chief of staff of the SNA, continuing to preside over the NFL, which will restructure into four legions.

Biography
Little is known about al-Haji's background; his photos were completely absent from the media and social networking sites until his public appearance in a press announcement in Urfa, southern Turkey, on 4 October 2019 that saw the National Front for Liberation merge with the Syrian National Army. The Sham Legion is also known for keeping lists of its commanders, including dozens of defected military officers, secretive.

Fadlallah al-Haji was born in the village of Kafr Yahmoul in the northern Idlib countryside in northwestern Syria. He joined the Syrian Armed Forces and attained the rank of colonel. In late 2012, during the escalation of the Syrian Civil War, he defected to the Free Syrian Army and joined the Shield of the Revolution Brigade as the group's deputy commander, serving under Colonel Mustafa Abdul Karim. The Shield of the Revolution Brigade was part of the Muslim Brotherhood-affiliated Shields of the Revolution Council, which became the Sham Legion in March 2014, with al-Haji serving as a commander of the Legion.

On 15 March 2020, Step News Agency reported that Fadlallah al-Haji had resigned from his position on the orders of the Turkish government. The move came after the discovery of a large-scale embezzlement involving the Sham Legion and other groups within the NFL who misrepresented the amount of fighters within their ranks in order to receive extra salaries from their Turkish ally. Turkey requested the NFL to prepare between 2,000 and 3,000 fighters to prepare for a Turkish Armed Forces-led military offensive against the Syrian Armed Forces in the western Aleppo Governorate in the event of the Russia–Turkey ceasefire breaking down, but the NFL only equipped 350 fighters after submitting 14,000 fake names to Turkey. However, Enab Baladi contacted Captain Naji Mustafa, who denied that al-Haji had resigned, and al-Haji continues to serve as the commander-in-chief of the NFL.

References

Living people
Syrian colonels
Defectors to the Free Syrian Army
Syrian Sunni Muslims
Syrian National Army
People from Idlib Governorate
Year of birth missing (living people)